Rubén Horacio Galletti (born 10 September 1950 in Buenos Aires) is a former Argentine footballer who two Primera División championships and played for the Argentina national team.

Galletti began his playing career with Boca Juniors in a game against Platense on 18 April 1971. After playing only ten games for Boca, he joined Estudiantes de La Plata where he made a total of 203 appearances and scored 88 goals in his two spells with the club.

Between 1978 and 1979 he played for Boca's fiercest rivals River Plate where he won both the Metropolitano and the Nacional championship in 1979.

Galletti returned to Estudiantes in 1980 where he was part of the Metropolitano championship winning team in 1982.

Galletti played out his career with Argentinos Juniors, Huracán and Talleres de Remedios de Escalada.

Galletti's son Luciano also played for Estudiantes before continuing his career in Italy.

Father and son made headlines in the Argentina press in October 2012, when they became donor and recipient in a kidney transplantation after Luciano had to retire from activity while playing for Olympiacos in 2010, following an acute kidney failure.

Titles

References

External links
 BDFA profile 

1950 births
Living people
Footballers from Buenos Aires
Argentine footballers
Argentina international footballers
Association football wingers
Boca Juniors footballers
Estudiantes de La Plata footballers
Club Atlético River Plate footballers
Argentinos Juniors footballers
Club Atlético Huracán footballers
Talleres de Remedios de Escalada footballers
Argentine Primera División players
Organ transplant donors